"Good Morning Britain" is a single by the Scottish band Aztec Camera featuring special guest  Mick Jones (of Big Audio Dynamite and The Clash). It was released as the second single from their 1990 studio album Stray. The song was written by Aztec Camera frontman Roddy Frame. It reached number 19 in the UK Singles Chart, and number 12 on the U.S. Alternative Songs chart.

Lyrics
The song is a protest song, listing in its first four verses problems and marginalization affecting Scotland, Northern Ireland, Wales and England, before ending with the hopeful message that standing up to injustice will make the country a better place.

Two contemporary politicians are referenced in the lyrics, with "ten long years and we've still got her" referring to Margaret Thatcher, and the verse about Wales mentioning Neil Kinnock.

Charts

References

1990 singles
Aztec Camera songs
Songs written by Roddy Frame
1990 songs
Songs about the United Kingdom